Achaya Sukumar Sen Mahavidyalaya, established in 2013, is the government general degree college in Purba Bardhaman district, West Bengal, India. It offers undergraduate courses in arts. It is affiliated to University of Burdwan.

See also

References

External links 

Universities and colleges in Purba Bardhaman district
Colleges affiliated to University of Burdwan
Educational institutions established in 2013
2013 establishments in West Bengal